Evergreen Memorial Park is a cemetery in Portsmouth, Virginia, United States. The earliest burials date back to 1906.

Notable interments 
 David Duffy Barrow (1876–1948), Spanish-American War Medal of Honor recipient
 Perry Ellis (1940–1986), fashion designer

The cemetery contains the war graves of 21 British Commonwealth naval personnel of World War II.

References

External links
 

Portsmouth, Virginia
Cemeteries in Portsmouth, Virginia